Os is a former municipality in the old Hordaland county, Norway. It was located in the Midhordland region, just south of Norway's second-largest city, Bergen. Due to its proximity to Bergen, Os experienced strong population growth.  The administrative centre (and commercial centre) of Os was the village of Osøyro. It is the largest settlement in the municipality, with over 60% of the municipal residents living here. Other large villages in Os included Hagavik, Halhjem, Søfteland, Søre Øyane, and Søvik. On 1 January 2020, the municipality became part of Bjørnafjorden Municipality in Vestland county.

Prior to its dissolution in 2020, the  municipality is the 360th largest by area out of the 422 municipalities in Norway. Os is the 57th most populous municipality in Norway with a population of 20,152.

History

The parish of Os was established as a formannskapsdistrikt, the predecessor of today's municipalities, on 1 January 1838. It originally encompassed all of the land surrounding the Fusafjorden. In 1856, the eastern district of Os (across the fjord) was separated to form the new, separate municipality of Fusa. This left Os with 3,750 residents.

In 1900, "Askviknes Barnehjem" (near Hagavik) opened; it housed children of romani/tater; in the beginning the children's stay was something their families applied for; later children were introduced to the facility without consent of their families.

On 1 January 1907, the northern part of the municipality was separated to form the new municipality of Samnanger. This left Os with 3,188 residents. During the 1960s, there were many municipal mergers across Norway due to the work of the Schei Committee. On 1 January 1964, the Bogstrand area of Fusa (population: 28) was transferred to Os. This was the only part of Fusa on the west side of the fjord.

During World War II, the Ulven concentration camp was used by the occupying Nazi German Army. It was located just northwest of Osøyro.

On 1 January 2020, the neighboring municipalities of Os and Fusa were merged to form the new Bjørnafjorden Municipality.

Name
The municipality is named after the old Os farm, where the first Os Church was built. The name is identical with the Old Norse word "óss" which means "mouth of a river"; referring to the Oselva River.

Coat of arms
The coat of arms is relatively modern, having been adopted in 1949 after a local competition. The arms are gold with a red background. The lower part of it shows one Oselvar, a boat design traditionally associated with the area. There is a small flower design above the boat.

Churches
The Church of Norway had one parish within the municipality of Os. It is part of the Fana prosti (deanery) in the Diocese of Bjørgvin.

Government

The municipal council  of Os was made up of 35 representatives that were elected to four year terms. The party breakdown of the final municipal council was as follows:

Mayor

In 1999, the Progress Party won the local election, and Terje Søviknes became the first Progress Party politician to hold the position of mayor in Os. He was re-elected in 2003, 2007, and 2011.

Before World War II, the municipality was led by Mayor Nils Tveit from 1916 to 1940. He also held the position briefly after the German occupation of Norway had ended.

Geography
The municipality of Os was located on the southwestern part of the Bergen Peninsula, south of the municipality of Bergen and southeast of the municipality of Samnanger. The Fusafjorden was to the east, the Bjørnafjorden to the south, and the Lysefjorden lies to the west. The municipality of Fusa was located to the east (across the Fusafjorden), the municipality of Tysnes was to the south (across the Bjørnafjorden), and the municipality of Austevoll was to the west (across the Lysefjorden).

The southwestern part of Os included many small islands including Skorpo, Strøno, and Innerøya. The village area of Søre Øyane was located on several small islands off the mainland shore.

The municipality was somewhat mountainous, especially in the northeastern part of the municipality. The mountain Sveningen was a tripoint boundary, marking the boundary point where the municipalities of Bergen, Os, and Samnanger meet. It was located in extreme northeastern Os. The mountains of Mosnuken and Lyshornet are both located in Os.

Culture

The Oseana Art and Cultural Centre is located in Os. It hosts art and music events year-round. The building is fairly new and in 2011, it won the "Building of the Year Award" for Norway.

Industry
Os has a tradition of small boat building since the early 1800s. The Oselvar is the traditional boat of Os. This small wooden boat was named after its major important building site during the 18th century, at the mouth of the Oselva River. These boats have traditionally been used for everyday work and for traveling to church. These boats were designed as either sailboats or rowboats. They still build these boats the traditional way in Os, and tourists are able to visit and watch them work.

The Oselvar is now the official boat of Norway. With its traditions, the boat has become a symbol of the nation. The boat is shown on the coat of arms of Os.

Hagavik, a village in Os municipality, also has a modern boat building company, Askeladden Boats AS. Askeladden is Norway's largest manufacturer of leisure boats.

Transportation

The European route E39 highway runs through Os from the city of Bergen (to the north) to the ferry quay at Halhjem, on the shore of the Bjørnafjorden. The quay has two different regularly-scheduled ferry routes that stop here to cross the Bjørnafjorden. There is a ferry from Halhjem to Våge on the island of Tysnesøya in Tysnes municipality, to the southeast. There is also a ferry (that is part of the E39 highway) from Halhjem to Sandvika, just north of the village of Fitjar in Fitjar municipality, to the south.

The Norwegian government is planning to build a bridge or tunnel crossing to provide road access across the Bjørnafjorden. When completed, the northern terminus will be in Os.

Demographics

About 80% of the population of Os lived in urban settlements. About 1.9% of the population were registered as unemployed; the county and national average is 2.6%. 26% of the workforce were employed in public administration. 2% were employed in the primary sector of economic activity, 28.2 in the secondary sector, and 69.3% in the tertiary sector. In the period from 29 October to 4 November 2001, 45.7% of the workforce of Os commuted out of the municipality, mainly to Bergen. In the same period, Os received a daily average of 753 commuters from other municipalities, 15.8% of those employed in Os. In 2006, Os had a daily out-commuting of 3,001 people.

Notable residents
The famous violinist Ole Bull built his summerhouse in Os, on an island named Lysøen. The special building was inspired by his travels, especially his travels to the Middle East. Lysøen was originally owned by Lyse Abbey, the ruins of which still stand and are frequently visited.

The singer-songwriter Aurora Aksnes, although born in Stavanger, grew up in Os.

See also
List of former municipalities of Norway

References

External links

Municipal fact sheet from Statistics Norway 
Askeladden Boats AS  official website
Oselvar Boat Yard

 
Bjørnafjorden
Former municipalities of Norway
1838 establishments in Norway
2020 disestablishments in Norway